is a passenger railway station in the city of Yachiyo, Chiba, Japan, operated by the third sector railway operator Tōyō Rapid Railway.

Lines
Tōyō-Katsutadai Station is a terminus of the Tōyō Rapid Railway Line, and is 16.2 km from the opposing terminus of the line at Nishi-Funabashi Station.

Station layout 
The station is an underground station with a single island platform serving two tracks, located on the second basement level. The ticket barriers are on the first basement level.

Platforms

History
Tōyō-Katsutadai Station was opened on April 27, 1996. In 1997, an underground passage was built to the nearby Keisei Main Line Katsutadai Station.

Passenger statistics
In fiscal 2018, the station was used by an average of 31,927 passengers daily.

Surrounding area
 Tōyō-Katsutadai  bus terminal
 Yachiyodai High School

See also
 List of railway stations in Japan

References

External links

 Toyo Rapid Railway Station information 

Railway stations in Japan opened in 1996
Railway stations in Chiba Prefecture
Yachiyo, Chiba